Target Video (aka TargetVideo77) is a San Francisco-based studio, founded by artist Joe Rees, who collaborating with Jackie Sharp, Jill Hoffman, Sam Edwards and others, archived early art performance, punk and hardcore bands on video and film. Performers and artists as diverse as the Sex Pistols, the Dead Kennedys, The Screamers, The Cramps, William S. Burroughs, The Clash, the Avengers, 
Mark Pauline, Survival Research Labs, The Go-Go's, John Cooper Clarke, Bauhaus, X, The Dils, Johanna Went, Talking Heads, Black Flag, Flipper, D.O.A and Crucifix were recorded in the late 1970s to the early 1980s. Using multiple cameras, they produced some of the highest quality footage available of these bands performing in front of live audiences. In addition, videos often included interviews with members of the bands. 
They also organized a national U.S.A. tour for Berlin's (West) punk rock band MDK /Mekanik Destrüktiw Komandöh with singer Volker Hauptvogel and released with Rough Trade USA the 12" Maxi-Single Berlin of this Band. The video made at South Van Ness Ave is lost.

Activities
Target Video taped bands and artists in the US and Europe in clubs, on the streets and at parties or at its 12,000 sf studio in San Francisco's Mission District. Target Video warehouse shoots were taped with an audience who came to party and see the band. Generally, they started in the afternoon and continued on into the night.  In the local scene everyone knew everyone else, and it was a casual, creative environment. The Target Video warehouse was the scene of many after hours parties as they played host to touring bands after their gigs with DJs and Target videos projected on to 20 ft. walls.  Joe Rees developed an editing style uncommon for the time using fast cuts juxtaposing images of military jets, punk bands, crowds and other footage creating the "Target Montage." These montages along with live footage of bands and artists became the basis for "Target Shows" which were shown in the US and Europe.

Tours
In 1980, Joe Rees, Jackie Sharp, Jill Hoffman, Sam Edwards and Jeanine Richardson took Target Video on its first extensive European tour.  The French company Fnac invited Target to France where they screened then unknown, underground punk bands and artists throughout the country to packed crowds in theaters, clubs and discos.  In the following years subsequent tours brought many shows including an outdoor show at Rome's ancient Colosseum and at the opening of the Alcalá 20 nightclub (a converted opera house) in Madrid, Spain. Shortly after, the Alcalá 20 nightclub was the site of a tragic inferno fire on Dec. 17, 1983. In March, 2008, Joe Rees & Target Video exhibited at the Getty Center in Los Angeles, California as part of the "California Video" exhibit.  In June, 2008 Target Video screened to an audience of 2000 at the Geffen Contemporary at the Museum of Contemporary Art, Los Angeles (MOCA). In 2009 Target Video had shows in Croatia, Los Angeles and San Francisco (San Francisco Public Library, Yerba Buena Center for the Arts.)

The Target Video Warehouse
The Target Video warehouse was clubhouse of sorts with three floors of video recording, audio recording (Subterranean Studio), publishing (Damage Magazine) as well as a ground zero for many parties and events. It was located at 678 South Van Ness Ave. in San Francisco. This building suffered extensive damage in the Loma Prieta earthquake of 1989. Target Video no longer occupies the South Van Ness space.

The Cramps at Napa State Mental Hospital
Target Video captured one of music's most infamous performances at Napa State Mental Hospital in 1978. The show was headlined by the Mutants and opening on the bill were The Cramps.  Shot with the first commercially available black and white port-a-pack, the Cramps began the show for a couple of car loads of punks, artists and the patients of the institution. The Mutants followed the Cramps set and although their set was recorded, available light was gone, and the footage is mostly unwatchable given the primitive technology of the day. Target Video has stated they will attempt to restore the Mutants performance in the near future using modern technology. The Cramps performance is widely available on DVD.

Releases (partial list)
 The Screamers - Live in 1978 in San Francisco
 Dead Kennedys - The Early Years Live (1978–1981)
 The Mutants - Live at the School For The Deaf
 The Cramps - Live At The Napa State Mental Hospital (June 1978)
 Devo - Live 1980
 Iggy Pop - Live in San Francisco 1981
 The Stranglers - Live In 1978 In San Francisco
 Throbbing Gristle - Live In San Francisco At Kezar Stadium
 Chrome / Bauhaus: Live in London - (This compilation video features Bauhaus recorded live at the University of London and 4 of Chrome's film/videos.)
 The Avengers (Live at the Temple and the Mabuhay Gardens, 1978)
 Crucifix/MDC - Live at the On Broadway, San Francisco, 1983
 The Damned - Live (1978)
 Crime - Live At San Quentin Penitentiary 
 Z'EV - 'Six Examples' - 1978-84 including performances from The Mabuhay Gardens, University of London and The Farm  
 Black Flag - (1979-1981)

In addition to these releases, there are other re-released compilations (Hardcore Vol. 1–5) featuring bands such as Toxic Reasons, Code of Honor, and Negative Trend.

External links
 Target Video blog
 Punk Globe interview with Jackie Sharp & Jill Hoffman
 Pacific Film Archive
 California Video Exhibition at Getty Center, Los Angeles
 SRQ Magazine Interview

Joe Rees
 L.A. Record
 Steven Wolf Gallery exhibit

Jackie Sharp
 

Jill Hoffman-Kowal
 Jill Hoffman-Kowal website

American film studios
Cinema of the San Francisco Bay Area
Companies based in San Francisco
Punk rock